Keratin 12 is a protein that in humans is encoded by the KRT12 gene.

Keratin 12 is keratin found expressed in corneal epithelia. Mutations in the gene encoding this protein lead to Meesmann corneal dystrophy.

References

Further reading

Keratins